Hijkersmilde is a hamlet in the Dutch province of Drenthe. It is a part of the municipality of Midden-Drenthe, and lies about 13 km southwest of Assen. Between 1913 and 1933, it had a train station.

References

Midden-Drenthe
Populated places in Drenthe